Cyclotosaurus buechneri is a species of the temnospondyl genus Cyclotosaurus from the Upper Triassic (middle Carnian) of northwestern Germany.

The type and only known specimen is a 28 cm long skull that was found in 1975 by Martin Büchner, the former director of the Natural History Museum Bielefeld, at a construction site in Bielefeld-Sieker, Germany. The specimen derives from the Stuttgart Formation and is kept in the collection of the Natural History Museum in Bielefeld. In 2016, Florian Witzmann, Sven Sachs and Christian Nyhuis provided a detailed description of the skull and established the new species, Cyclotosaurus buechneri, honoring the discoverer. 

Cyclotosaurus buechneri differs from other species of Cyclotosaurus e.g. by a narrower distance between the orbitae, a more slender postorbital region and a distinct shape of the jugal. It was nearly 2 meter long and is the only unequivocal evidence of a cyclotosaur in northern Germany.

Phylogeny

The phylogenetic position of C. buechneri within the genus Cyclotosaurus according to Witzmann et al.

References

External links 
 Cyclotosaurus buechneri A Triassic temnospondyl amphibian from Germany by Sachs Vertebrate Palaeontology Research
 Cyclotosaurus buechneri by Naturkunde-Museum Bielefeld (NAMU, in German)
 Press release, Museum fuer Naturkunde, Berlin

Triassic temnospondyls of Europe